Rathnagiriswarar Temple is a Hindu temple dedicated to Shiva, located in Thirumarugal, 10 km East of Nannilam, Near Nagapatnam, in Nagapattinam district, Tamil Nadu in India.

It is one of the 275 Paadal Petra Sthalams, where two of the most revered Nayanars (Saivite Saints), Appar and Tirugnana Sambandar have sung the glories of this temple.

Name origin
Thirumarugal derived its name from a plantain named Marugal, a type of banana tree found inside the northern-side of the Rathnagiriswarar temple since time immemorial.

Temple
The temple has a 5-tier Rajagopuram and a large campus.  The sanctum has an elevated structure.  The temple tank is right in front of the temple.  Rathinagiri is about 13 km from Vellore towards Chennai and is famous for the Murugan temple on a hillock. There are 130 steps to the hillock top. Saint Arunagirinadhar had sung Thiruppugazh on this temple. The temple belonging to the 14th century was under dilapidated conditions a few decades back and with the efforts of Sri Swami Balamugan Adimai, the temple is now restored to its full glory with fantastic sculptural works, big mandapams etc., to the extent of people calling this as the 7th Padai Veedu of Lord Muruga.

Legend

Gallery

References

Notes
 

Shiva temples in Nagapattinam district
Padal Petra Stalam